Turtle Lake is a census-designated place in the town of Richmond, Walworth County, Wisconsin, United States. Its population was 348 as of the 2020 census.

 

Turtle Lake is 141 acres and has a maximum depth of 30 feet. Visitors have access to the lake from a public boat landing. Fish include panfish, largemouth bass, and northern pike. The lake's water is moderately clear.

Businesses on the lake include Snug Harbor Inn, McIntyre's Resort, & The Turtle Tap and Grill.

Demographics

References

Census-designated places in Walworth County, Wisconsin
Census-designated places in Wisconsin